The American Association of Colleges of Osteopathic Medicine (AACOM) is a non-profit organization that supports the 38 accredited colleges of osteopathic medicine (COMs) in the United States. These colleges are accredited to deliver instruction at 61 teaching locations in 35 states. In the current academic year, these colleges are educating more than 35,000 future physicians—25 percent of all U.S. medical students. Seven of the colleges are public and 31 are private institutions.

AACOM serves as a unifying voice for osteopathic medical education (OME), fostering collaboration among its member institutions, and is active in advocacy at the federal government level. The Association is governed by its Board of Deans and led by President Robert A. Cain, DO

AACOM often works in collaboration with other allied organizations and promotes public awareness for osteopathic medicine and OME. The association provides centralized services to its members, including data collection and analysis, and operation of its online application service, AACOMAS, for prospective students applying to U.S. osteopathic medical schools.

Mission 
AACOM provides leadership for the osteopathic medical education community by promoting excellence in medical education, research and service, and by fostering innovation and quality across the continuum of osteopathic medical education to improve the health of the American public.

History 
Osteopathic medicine was founded in the late 1800s in Kirksville, Missouri, by Andrew Taylor Still, MD, DO, a medical doctor who recognized that the medical practices of the day often caused more harm than good. He focused on developing a system of medical care that would promote the body's innate ability to heal itself and called this system of medicine osteopathy, now known as osteopathic medicine.

In 2012, AACOM worked with the Association of American Medical Colleges to improve medical education on post-traumatic stress disorder and traumatic brain injuries. 

Osteopathic physicians, also known as DOs, work in partnership with their patients. They consider the impact that lifestyle and community have on the health of each individual, and they work to break down barriers to good health. DOs are licensed to practice the full scope of medicine in all 50 states. They practice in all types of environments, including the military, and in all types of specialties, from family medicine to obstetrics, surgery, and aerospace medicine.

Publications
AACOM publishes the Student Guide to Osteopathic Medical Colleges annually and Inside OME, a biweekly e-newsletter covering news related to osteopathic medicine and OME, legislation, updates on the transition to a single graduate medical education (GME) system, and more. AACOM also publishes a number of reports throughout the year which focus on original research and data in OME.

AACOM Councils
Created by the AACOM Board of Deans, AACOM councils support the work of the Association on behalf of all member colleges. Councils typically meet twice a year and collaborate regularly through the AACOMmunities online forum. AACOM also hosts online discussions for a wide variety of ad hoc committees and other interest groups in AACOMmunities.

Programs and initiatives 
AACOM also sponsors or co-sponsors a variety of programs and initiatives for audiences at every level of osteopathic medical education, from students to senior administrators. AACOM also offers opportunities for both medical students and health care professionals, including scholarships, internships, fellowships, and grants.

See also
 Association of Osteopathic Directors and Medical Educators
 List of medical specialty colleges in the United States

References

External links
AACOM's official website

School accreditors
Medical education in the United States
Osteopathic medical associations in the United States
Medical and health organizations based in Maryland